Guitar Interludes is an album by American jazz guitarist Joe Pass that was released in 1969.

Reception

Writing for Allmusic, music critic Scott Yanow said of the album "This odd LP certainly stands out in his discography. The five brief "Interludes," along with "Joey's Blues," feature Pass playing unaccompanied for some of the first times on record, but with the exception of the "Blues," the music is quiet and uneventful. The remaining seven selections are quite a contrast, for they feature Pass and a funky rhythm section essentially accompanying seven singers on a variety of very dated pop songs; for his part, Pass sounds quite uncomfortable."

Track listing
All tracks composed by Joe Pass except where indicated
 "Interlude #1 (Song for Alison)"
 "Interlude #2 (For Bobbye)"
 "Interlude #3 (Levanto Seventy)"
 "Interlude #4 (Vesper Dreams)"
 "Interlude #5 (Shasti)"
 "Joey's Blues"
 "The Maid with the Flaxen Hair" (Claude Debussy)
 "A Time for Us" (Edwin Snyder, Larry Kusik, Nino Rota)
 "Peter Peter" (Irwin Rosman)
 "Go Back to Her" (Allen Rosman, Irwin Rosman)
 "Don't Walk Away" (Irwin Rosman)
 "Long Ago Yesterday" (Irwin Rosman)
 "Blue Carousel" (Irwin Rosman)

Personnel
 Joe Pass – guitar
 Mike Melvoin – keyboards
 Del Casher – guitar
 Vincent Terri – guitar
 Jesse Ehrlich – cello
 Monty Budwig – bass
 Jim Hughart – bass
 Colin Bailey – drums
 Frank Severino – drums
 Victor Feldman – percussion
 Bob Smale – arranger, conductor

References

1969 albums
Joe Pass albums
Discovery Records albums